Golden Arms Redemption is the debut solo studio album by American rapper U-God. It was released on October 19, 1999 via Wu-Tang/Priority Records. Recording sessions took place at Quad Recording Studios, at Studio 57, at Unique Recording Studios and at 36 Chambers in New York, and at Studios South in Miami. Production was handled by True Master, Inspectah Deck, Homicide, Bink!, Hak Da Navigator, John The Baptist, Omonte "O" Ward, and RZA, who also served as executive producer together with U-God. It features guest appearances from Leatha Face, Hell Razah, Inspectah Deck, Method Man, Raekwon and Drey Wit Da Y. The album peaked at number 58 on the Billboard 200 and number 15 on the Top R&B/Hip-Hop Albums in the United States. It spawned two singles: "Bizarre" and "Dat's Gangsta". Its lead single reached number seven on the Hot Rap Songs. The song "Rumble" was used as the main song for the video game Wu-Tang: Shaolin Style.

Track listing

Sample credits
Track 6 contains excerpts from "Far Cry" by Marvin Gaye.

Personnel

Lamont "U-God" Hawkins – main artist, executive producer, sleeve notes
Orlando "Leatha Face" Irizarry – featured artist (tracks: 3, 7, 10, 14)
Drey Wit Da Y – additional vocals (track 3)
Jason "Inspectah Deck" Hunter – featured artist (track 7), producer (track 3)
Clifford "Method Man" Smith – featured artist (track 7)
Chron "Hell Razah" Smith – featured artist (tracks: 8, 10)
Corey "Raekwon" Woods – featured artist (track 10)
Robert "RZA" Diggs – producer (tracks: 1, 9, 13), recording (track 9), executive producer
Derek "True Master" Harris – producer (tracks: 2, 4, 7)
A. "Homocide" Mercado – producer (tracks: 5, 15)
Roosevelt "Bink!" Harrell III – producer (track 6)
Hakim "Hak Da Navigator" Ali – producer (tracks: 8, 10)
John "The Baptist" Hitchmon – producer (tracks: 11, 14)
Omonte "O" Ward – producer (track 12)
Pete Kessler – recording (track 1)
Carlos Bess – mixing (tracks: 2, 9, 12, 13)
Andi Carr – recording (tracks: 2, 4, 8, 11, 12, 14)
Arty Sky – recording (tracks: 3, 5, 13, 15), mixing (tracks: 3, 5, 8, 10, 11, 14)
Jose "Choco" Reynoso – mixing (tracks: 4, 7, 15)
Kenny Ortiz – recording (tracks: 6, 7, 10), mixing (track 6)
Chris Athens – mastering
John "Mook" Gibbons – co-executive producer
Michele "Michou" Robinson – art direction
Clay McBride – photography
Jay "Mighty Healthy" Quinn – production coordinator
Tamika Layton – project coordinator

Charts

References

External links

U-God albums
1999 debut albums
Albums produced by RZA
Priority Records albums
Albums produced by True Master
Albums produced by Bink (record producer)